Sir James Carnegie of Pittarrow, 3rd Baronet (1716 – 30 April 1765) was a Scottish politician, soldier and (but for the attainder of the 5th Earl) 6th Earl of Southesk, 6th Baron Carnegie of Kinnaird and 6th Baron Carnegie, of Kinnaird and Leuchars.

Background
He was the eldest son of Sir John Carnegie, 2nd Baronet and his wife Mary Burnett, daughter of Sir Thomas Burnett, 3rd Baronet. In 1729, aged only thirteen, he succeeded his father as baronet. A year later, with the death of his cousin, the forfeited James Carnegie, 5th Earl of Southesk, he would have succeeded to that title also, but for the attainder. His guardians until his majority Andrew Fletcher, Lord Milton and Sir Alexander Ramsay of Balmain sent Carnegie to the University of Glasgow for education.

Career
Carnegie joined the British Army in 1737 and served under Prince William, Duke of Cumberland in the Battle of Fontenoy in 1745. A year later he fought for the House of Hanover in the Battle of Culloden, while his younger brother supported the Jacobite side. Carnegie entered the British House of Commons in 1741, representing Kincardineshire until his death in 1765.

Family
On 5 July 1752, he married Christian Doig, eldest daughter of David Doig, and by her had two daughters and four sons. Carnegie died and was buried at Stamford, Lincolnshire. He was succeeded in the baronetcy by his oldest son David.

References

1716 births
1765 deaths
Baronets in the Baronetage of Nova Scotia
British Army officers
British Army personnel of the Jacobite rising of 1745
British Army personnel of the War of the Austrian Succession
British MPs 1741–1747
British MPs 1747–1754
British MPs 1754–1761
British MPs 1761–1768
Members of the Parliament of Great Britain for Scottish constituencies